Gamma Crateris is a binary star system, divisible with a small amateur telescope, and located at the center of the southern constellation of Crater. It is visible to the naked eye with an apparent visual magnitude of 4.06. With an annual parallax shift of 39.62 mas as seen from Earth, this star is located 82.3 light years from the Sun. Based upon the motion of this system through space, it is a potential member of the Castor Moving Group.

The star was confirmed by Gabriel Cristian Neagu and Jan Ovidiu Tercu as a variable of DSCT type. The variability has an amplitude of 0.001 magnitudes and a main period of 0.03647 d  (52.52 min). The variability was discovered during the datamining activity with the goal of increasing the student's investigative competences.

The primary, component A, is a white-hued A-type main sequence star of apparent visual magnitude 4.08 with a stellar classification of A9 V. The star has an estimated 1.81 times the mass of the Sun and around 1.3 times the Sun's radius. It is about 757 million years old and is spinning with a projected rotational velocity of 144 km/s. The primary is radiating 18.8 times the solar luminosity from its outer atmosphere at an effective temperature of 8,020 K. Based upon the detection of an infrared excess, the star may host an orbiting debris disk. However, this finding remains in doubt.

The companion, component B, is a magnitude 9.6 star with an estimated mass 75% that of the Sun. As of 2010, the companion was located at an angular separation of 4.98 arc seconds along a position angle of 93.1° relative to the primary. This is equivalent to a projected separation of 125.6 AU. This star may be the source of the X-ray emission detected coming from this system.

References

External links

A-type main-sequence stars
Binary stars
Crater (constellation)
Crateris, Gamma
Durchmusterung objects
Crateris, 15
099211
055705
4405